Thimmasamudram is a village in T.Sundupalle mandal of Kadapa district in Andhra Pradesh, India. It is on the banks of the Cheyyeru river, a tributary of the Penner River. It is located on the alternative road route from Rayachoti to Piler. Thimmasamudram has a postal area code of 516130. It is across the river bank from T. Sundupalle, and is a gram panchayat.

References 

Thimmasamudram is rich in agriculture that is famous for mangoes and paddy. This village is located on the bank of cheyyeru river. This village is 2 km distant from T.Sundupalli. There is a bridge between these two villages on the river.  Most of the people in this village are Hindus and Muslims. The agriculture area of the village is so fertile that it yields three crops per year. At the entrance of the village there is a big banyan tree and around the tree there are some temples. That tells us that this village is an ancient one. Once upon a time this village was full of trees and with monkeys in the thousands. By the name of monkeys the name of the village is derived as Thimma samudram (thimma means monkey and samudram means more quantity). As the village has good water sources, this village appears with beautiful natural scenery.

Villages in Kadapa district